Japanese Grand Prix can refer to:

Japanese Grand Prix, a Formula One motor race
Japanese motorcycle Grand Prix
Japanese motorcycle trials Grand Prix
Japanese motorcross Grand Prix